Colonial National Bank Building, also known as the Grant Myers Building, is a historic bank building located at Connellsville, Fayette County, Pennsylvania.  It was built in 1906, as a one-story, open bank building.  It was remodeled during the 1930s, to be two-stories.  It has two Classical Revival facades, featuring four, two-story Ionic order columns supporting a pediment on each side.

It was added to the National Register of Historic Places in 2002.

References

Bank buildings on the National Register of Historic Places in Pennsylvania
Neoclassical architecture in Pennsylvania
Commercial buildings completed in 1906
Buildings and structures in Fayette County, Pennsylvania
National Register of Historic Places in Fayette County, Pennsylvania
1906 establishments in Pennsylvania